Yesteryear is a barbershop quartet that – coached by Darryl Flinn, Lance Heilmann, Larry Ajer, Greg Lyne, and other big names in barbershop – won the 1997 SPEBSQSA international competition.

The original version of Yesteryear was formed in February 1984. Over the years, five personnel changes led to the championship foursome.

SPEBSQSA International competition results
Yesteryear achieved the following results in SPEBSQSA International competitions:

1993: 8th place
1994: 3rd place (bronze medal)
1995: 2nd place (silver medal)
1996: 2nd place (silver medal)
1997: 1st place (gold medal)

Discography
Champions (CD; 1998)

References

External links
 AIC entry

American vocal groups
Barbershop Harmony Society
Barbershop quartets
Musical groups established in 1984